Omaha is a small beach town on Omaha Bay in the Rodney District, in the north of New Zealand. It is located 74.7 km north of Auckland. It is on a sandspit that adjoins Tawharanui Peninsula and separates Whangateau Harbour from Omaha Bay. The nearest sizable town is Warkworth which is situated 16.8 km south west of Omaha.

History 
Omaha was a Marutūāhu settlement until 1841, when it was bought by the Crown. Early European settlement took place at Sandspit.

Omaha means 'bountiful food' or 'great resources' in Māori. Nearby Leigh was historically named Omaha by Māori, and Omaha Beach was called Mangatawhiri by Ngāti Manuhiri.

Geography
The sandspit of Omaha was formed during the last glacial period, approximately 5000 to 6000 years BP. The beach sediment composition is over 70% quartz sand, which gifted Omaha the natural "white" appearance. There are three artificial groynes had been placed at northern part of the sandspit, to accumulate sediment from longshore drift. Local council in last two decades had been placing various groups of plant to stabilize the dunes, including Spinifex, pingao, iceplant and marram grass.

Omaha Spit has also been identified by the Department of Conservation as a "significant breeding site for the endangered New Zealand dotterel. As a result, The Omaha Shorebird Protection Trust was established in 2009 to monitor the dotterel population at Omaha. Fundraising of $162,000 by the Trust saw construction of a predator-proof fence completed in August 2012 helping to protect the birds, their chicks and eggs from predation by cats, rats, stoats, wessels and hedgehogs.

Demographics
Omaha is part of the larger Tawharanui Peninsula statistical area.

Omaha had a population of 756 at the 2018 New Zealand census, an increase of 135 people (21.7%) since the 2013 census, and an increase of 336 people (80.0%) since the 2006 census. There were 321 households, comprising 372 males and 384 females, giving a sex ratio of 0.97 males per female, with 111 people (14.7%) aged under 15 years, 57 (7.5%) aged 15 to 29, 345 (45.6%) aged 30 to 64, and 243 (32.1%) aged 65 or older.

Ethnicities were 96.0% European/Pākehā, 6.7% Māori, 2.4% Pacific peoples, 1.2% Asian, and 0.8% other ethnicities. People may identify with more than one ethnicity.

Although some people chose not to answer the census's question about religious affiliation, 53.6% had no religion, 39.3% were Christian, 0.4% were Hindu and 0.8% had other religions.

Of those at least 15 years old, 144 (22.3%) people had a bachelor's or higher degree, and 69 (10.7%) people had no formal qualifications. 162 people (25.1%) earned over $70,000 compared to 17.2% nationally. The employment status of those at least 15 was that 234 (36.3%) people were employed full-time, 108 (16.7%) were part-time, and 6 (0.9%) were unemployed.

Community
Former Prime Minister and National Party leader John Key has owned property in Omaha for over 20 years. New Zealand fashion designer Trelise Cooper also has a property at Omaha as does former television presenter Louise Wallace.

Omaha has a boat ramp, surf club, an 18 hole golf course, tennis courts, bowling club and children's playgrounds.

From 2018 it has been served by 7 buses a day to Warkworth.

See also
Matakana

References

External links
 Omaha Beach Community Website

Rodney Local Board Area
Populated places in the Auckland Region
Beaches of the Auckland Region
Matakana Coast